The 2007–08 season was the 84th season in the existence of AEK Athens F.C. and the 49th consecutive season in the top flight of Greek football. They competed in the Super League, the Greek Cup, the Champions League and the UEFA Cup. The season began on 15 August 2007 and finished on 14 May 2008.

Overview

AEK Athens bolstered the strength of their squad with the signings of Brazilian legend Rivaldo, following up with several other strong signings in Arruabarrena and Ismael Blanco. The club sold 25,495 season tickets.

After finishing 2nd in Super League Greece previous season, AEK entered the UEFA Champions League in the Third qualifying round. On 3 August, they were drawn against Sevilla and the first match was played in Seville on 15 August, while the second was held at the Athens Olympic Stadium. After being eliminated from the Champions League, AEK were drawn to play against Salzburg in the UEFA Cup. After defeating Salzburg 3–1 on aggregate, they were on 9 October drawn in Group C in the UEFA Cup group stage along with Villarreal, Fiorentina, Mladá Boleslav and Elfsborg. On 20 December, AEK booked their place in the knockout stage, finishing third in the group. They were drawn to play Getafe in the next round of the UEFA Cup where they were knocked out 4–1 on aggregate. On 12 February AEK parted ways with Ferrer after a poor run of form and unsuccessful signings.

The team initially finished the first in the league, but after the court case between Apollon Kalamarias and Olympiacos for the illegal line-up of Roman Wallner (he had already appeared for 3 different clubs this season) in the 1–0 Apollon Kalamarias win earlier in the season, Olympiacos were awarded the 3 points thus finishing 2 points ahead of AEK Athens. Afterwards, AEK finished 2nd in the league play-offs which found them qualify for the next seasons' UEFA Cup.

Players

Squad information

NOTE: The players are the ones that have been announced by the AEK Athens' press release. No edits should be made unless a player arrival or exit is announced. Updated 30 June 2008, 23:59 UTC+3.

Transfers

In

Summer

Winter

Out

Summer

Loan in

Summer

Winter

Loan out

Summer

Winter

Renewals

Overall transfer activity

Expenditure
Summer:  €3,460,000

Winter:  €150,000

Total:  €3,610,000

Income
Summer:  €565,000

Winter:  €0

Total:  €565,000

Net Totals
Summer:  €2,895,000

Winter:  €150,000

Total:  €3,045,000

Club

Management

Kit

|

|

|

Other information

Manager stats

Key
* Served as caretaker manager.

Only competitive matches are counted. Wins, losses and draws are results at the final whistle; the results of penalty shootouts are not counted.

Pre-season and friendlies

Super League Greece

Regular season

League table

Results summary

Results by Matchday

Fixtures

Play-offs

Results by Matchday

Fixtures

Greek Cup

AEK entered the Greek Cup at the Round of 32.

Matches

UEFA Champions League

Third qualifying round

UEFA Cup

First round

Group stage

Round of 32

UEFA rankings

Correct as of 27 May 2008

Statistics

Squad statistics

! colspan="15" style="background:#FFDE00; text-align:center" | Goalkeepers
|-

! colspan="15" style="background:#FFDE00; color:black; text-align:center;"| Defenders
|-

! colspan="15" style="background:#FFDE00; color:black; text-align:center;"| Midfielders
|-

! colspan="15" style="background:#FFDE00; color:black; text-align:center;"| Forwards
|-

! colspan="15" style="background:#FFDE00; color:black; text-align:center;"| Left during Winter Transfer Window
|-

|-
|}

Disciplinary record

|-
! colspan="23" style="background:#FFDE00; text-align:center" | Goalkeepers

|-
! colspan="23" style="background:#FFDE00; color:black; text-align:center;"| Defenders

|-
! colspan="23" style="background:#FFDE00; color:black; text-align:center;"| Midfielders

|-
! colspan="23" style="background:#FFDE00; color:black; text-align:center;"| Forwards

|-
! colspan="23" style="background:#FFDE00; color:black; text-align:center;"| Left during Winter Transfer window

|-
|}

Starting 11

References

AEK Athens F.C. Official Website

Greek football clubs 2007–08 season
2007-08